Molly Brown (1867–1932) was an American activist and Titanic survivor.

Molly Brown may also refer to:

Molly Brown (pageant titleholder), Miss Tennessee USA 1987
Molly Brown, nickname of the Gemini 3 space capsule
Molly Brown House, historical home in Denver, Colorado

See also
The Unsinkable Molly Brown (disambiguation)